The economic geography of the United Kingdom reflects its high position in the current economic league tables, as well as reflecting its long history as a trading nation and as an imperial power.  This in turn was built on exploitation of natural resources such as coal and iron ore.

Much has changed since Bevan's speech (below) in 1945, with the coalfields largely deserted and the Empire relinquished.  With its dominant position gone, the UK economic geography is increasingly shaped by the one constant: it is a trading nation.

Agriculture 
The UK has rarely been self-sufficient in terms of food supply and its modern pattern of agriculture reflects a combination of history, current public policy and comparative advantage.

Since the Enclosure Acts of the eighteenth century, the UK's uplands (including Wales and the Scottish Highlands) have largely been associated with animal husbandry and forestry.  However, by the time of the Enclosure Acts, most of lowland Britain was already enclosed by processes such as assarting or illegal, but tolerated, piecemeal enclosure.  However, evidence of the former open field system of agriculture can still be seen in some parts of the landscape, such as in the indentations remaining from boundary ditches of the former farming strips. Enclosure, in turn, led to intensification.

Most UK agriculture is intensive and highly mechanised, with the use of chemical fertilisers and insecticides routine.  By European standards it is very efficient, although that does not necessarily make it profitable.  This intense nature was compounded in the post-War years, with fields being expanded at the expense of hedgerows.  This process has been heavily criticised for damaging biodiversity.

East Anglia and South East England have been centres for grain production, with some areas of South East England also specialising in market gardening. The county of Kent was so well known for this that it is often referred to as the Garden of England and was particularly noted for hop growing. Dairy farming is most prevalent in South West England.

The detailed pattern of modern UK agriculture is heavily influenced by the Common Agricultural Policy of the European Union, with a combination of price support and set-aside policy.

Around the edges of south eastern towns, perfectly good agricultural land often remains uncultivated as a result of price distortions created by the Metropolitan Green Belt. Indeed, since around 2001 speculators have been buying Green Belt agricultural land, generally adjacent to built up areas, and selling it off in plots, persuading buyers that the government will have to weaken Green Belt protection to solve the housing crisis (see below). It is hard to see when such plots could come back into production.

Fossil fuels 
The UK's industry sector was once dominated by the coal; heavily concentrated in south Wales, north and south Staffordshire, Leicestershire and Derbyshire, South Yorkshire, Northumberland, County Durham, Fife and Midlothian.  The number of pits and miners have been slashed, and output fell by more than 75% between 1981 and 2003.  The remaining pits produced 17.2 million tonnes of oil equivalent in 2003, making the UK the 15th largest coal producing nation, compared with 4th in 1981, according to the BP Statistical Review of World Energy 2004.

The major primary industry is North Sea oil.  Its activity is concentrated on the east coast in Scotland and Northern England. The waters in the North Sea off the east coast of Scotland contain nearly half of the UK's remaining oil reserves, and a quarter of reserves are located in the North Sea near the Shetland Islands.  As of January 2004, the UK had proven crude oil reserves of 4.7 billion barrels (750,000,000 m³) including onshore reserves, according to the Oil and Gas Journal.

A closely related industry is natural gas which, since the 1970s, has supplied all of the UK gas needs, replacing poisonous coal, or town, gas.  Most natural gas production is in the North Sea, with a small amount onshore and in the Irish Sea.  The largest reserves not related to oil production are in the southern North Sea between the UK and the Netherlands, although; the largest reserves, are associated with oil production.  The UK is expected to become a net natural gas importer before 2010.

Manufacturing 

At one time or another virtually every product that can be imagined has been made in the UK.  In particular its heavy manufacturing drove the industrial revolution, starting with the first blast furnace at Coalbrookdale in Shropshire.

A map of the major UK cities gives a good picture of where manufacturing flourished, and often specialisations could be identified, in particular:
Birmingham (automotive)
Glasgow (shipbuilding)
London (various)
Manchester (textiles)
Bradford (textiles)
Newcastle (shipbuilding and steel)
Nottingham (apparel, medicine)
Stoke-on-Trent (ceramics)
Sheffield (steel and steel products)
Leeds (textiles and engineering)
Belfast (shipbuilding and textiles)
Cardiff (steel)

The automotive industry can be traced back to the 1890s (growing after World War I), by which time industries such as shipbuilding, textiles and steel were already established.

In the inter-War years modern industries emerged, with aerospace forming clusters around London, Bristol and in Hertfordshire. The Hertfordshire cluster no longer exists. The early electronics industry generally preferred the south, especially the home counties.

Today there is no heavy manufacturing industry in which UK-based firms can be considered world leaders and no product in which a UK city or region is the world leader. 

However, the Midlands, in particular, remains a strong manufacturing centre, with around a fifth of employment dependent on manufacturing, and the East Midlands Development Agency has a policy to maintaining this characteristic.

More recently, high technology firms have concentrated largely along the M4 motorway, partly because of access to London Heathrow Airport, but also because of the economies of agglomeration.  However, the general pattern remains that the south has lower, and falling, reliance on manufacturing.

Finance and services 

Once, every great city had a stock exchange. Now, the UK financial industry is concentrated overwhelmingly in the City of London and Canary Wharf, with back office and administrative operation often dispersed around the south of England.

London is one of the world's great financial centres, which is one of the factors that is commonly considered to make it a world city.  Central London contains some of the most expensive commercial property in the world because of this.

From around the early 1990s London has been able to boast of having more U.S. banks than New York, as well as being host to branches of more than five hundred overseas banks.  It is the principal financial centre of the world, ranked alongside New York and Tokyo as one of three where any serious financial player must be represented.

The City of London has around 300,000 employees, largely concentrated in the financial and professional sectors.

Within London, the desire for banks to be there put pressure on the City of London's ability to accommodate them.  In the mid-1980s a crisis point was reached and, although the city was able to expand its stock of modern office space, this did not happen before Canary Wharf had been set up as a competitor.  The irony is that Canary Wharf was built in the London Docklands that had, until 1970, been among the largest docks in the world. All manner of goods had been shipped from the factories of east London to the world; between 1961 and 1993 manufacturing employment in London fell from 1.6 million to 328,000.

During the mid-1990s, Leeds took advantage of the internet's arrival as part of the .com boom.  It became the UK's first city to have full broadband and digital coverage, making it a very attractive place for corporations to expand, particularly when opening call centres.  During the changing 1990s, Leeds had better connections to London than any other UK city, being 2 hours from London by train.  As a result, it is now the UK's 2nd largest financial and legal centre, and the UK's largest e-business sector with more than 1/3 of the UK's internet traffic passing through the city.

In this respect, Canary Wharf and Leeds are arguably more symbolic of the changed economic geography of the UK than any other place.

Quotes

References and further reading 
An Historical Geography of England and Wales, Robert A. Dodgshon, R.A. Butlin, Academic Press, 
 The Changing Geography of the United Kingdom Hugh Matthews, Vince Gardiner (eds), Routledge, 
 Spatial Divisions of Labour, Doreen Massey, Macmillan,

See also 
Economy of the United Kingdom
Geography of the United Kingdom
Culture of the United Kingdom
Politics of the United Kingdom
List of renewable resources produced and traded by the United Kingdom

References

External links 
Office of the Deputy Prime Minister – controls regional policy
Department of Trade and Industry
UK non-financial business economy: 2014 regional results (Annual Business Survey)

Geography of the United Kingdom
Economic geography